Charles El-Gressy (17 June 1929 – 5 September 2008) was a Moroccan pée, foil and sabre fencer. He competed in three events at the 1960 Summer Olympics.

References

External links
 

1929 births
2008 deaths
Moroccan male épée fencers
Olympic fencers of Morocco
Fencers at the 1960 Summer Olympics
Moroccan male foil fencers
Moroccan male sabre fencers
20th-century Moroccan people